A secondman or second man is a railway employee who assists the driver of a train. For this reason the term driver's assistant is also used. In this role, the second man could learn the duties of the driver and on passing the relevant tests and examinations become a driver himself.

With the ending of steam traction on many railways, the job of fireman or boilerman was made obsolete.  However, there were still many duties to be performed with diesel and electric traction that the driver could not do by themselves, such as preparation of locomotives, operation of train heating systems, shunting duties, and many others.

With increasing automation of rolling stock, many trains today only require the operation of a single driver, and thus this post has started to disappear.  However, it remains in many places, especially on heavy freight, express routes and night trains.  Trainee drivers (often known as traction trainees) may also act as secondmen in order to learn routes and operating methods.

Certain railway lines in the UK (for example, the East Suffolk Line) are not approved for driver-only operation. Passenger trains will usually have a driver and a guard, but empty stock movements would require a secondperson (usually a second qualified driver) or a guard to accompany the driver.

On heritage railways, where the older types of locomotives are still in use, the position of second man is still an important role filled by volunteers, and usually part of the training to become a driver.

External links
Railway crew names (US)
Crew duties and Driver-only trains (UK)

Railway occupations